Fenerbahçe Ülker is the professional men's basketball department of Fenerbahçe S.K., a major multisport club based in Istanbul, Turkey. 

For the season roster: 2006-07 Roster

Euroleague 2007-08

Regular season Group C

External links
Official Fenerbahçe site 
Fenerbahçe Ulker 
Euro League Page 
TBLStat.net 
Euroleague Format
Euroleague.net
Fenerbahçe fansite 

2006–07
2006–07 Euroleague
2006–07 in Turkish basketball by club